Alexander Martin (born 21 April 1987) is a British racing driver who competed in the British Touring Car Championship from 2015 - 2016.

Racing career

Martin began his career in the 2009 Porsche Carrera Cup Great Britain, he raced in the championship from 2009–2011 ending 7th in the Pro–Am 1 standings in 2011. He switched to the Ferrari Challenge Europe for the 2012 season, he finished 4th in the standings in 2014, with 122 points. In November 2014, it was announced that Martin would make his British Touring Car Championship debut with Motorbase Performance driving a Ford Focus ST, under the Dextra Racing banner. However, in March 2015 Motorbase Performance announced that they would miss the first half of the 2015 British Touring Car Championship season, with Team Parker Racing taking over the Dextra Racing entry.

Racing record

Complete British Touring Car Championship results
(key) (Races in bold indicate pole position – 1 point awarded just in first race; races in italics indicate fastest lap – 1 point awarded all races; * signifies that driver led race for at least one lap – 1 point given all races)

References

External links
 
 

1987 births
Living people
British Touring Car Championship drivers
English racing drivers
British racing drivers
Porsche Carrera Cup GB drivers